FC Malesh Mikrevo is a Bulgarian association football club based in the village of Mikrevo, Blagoevgrad Province, which currently competes in the A RFG Blagoevgrad, the fourth tier of the Bulgarian football league system.

The club was established in 1936. The biggest success in the club's history came in 2010, when the team earned promotion to the Bulgarian B PFG by decisively winning the South-West V AFG. The club's home ground is the Municipal Stadium in Mikrevo, which has a capacity for 3,000 spectators.

In December 2011, Vihren Sandanski obtained the license of Malesh. Malesh was subsequently demoted to playing in A RFG Blagoevgrad since the 2012-13 season.

Honours

South-West V AFG
Champions 2009-10
Amateur Football League Cup
Winners 2006-07

References

External links
 Official website

Association football clubs established in 1936
Malesh
1936 establishments in Bulgaria